In geometry, many uniform tilings on sphere, euclidean plane, and hyperbolic plane can be made by Wythoff construction within a fundamental triangle, (p q r), defined by internal angles as π/p, π/q, and π/r. Special cases are right triangles (p q 2). Uniform solutions are constructed by a single generator point with 7 positions within the fundamental triangle, the 3 corners, along the 3 edges, and the triangle interior. All vertices exist at the generator, or a reflected copy of it. Edges exist between a generator point and its image across a mirror. Up to 3 face types exist centered on the fundamental triangle corners. Right triangle domains can have as few as 1 face type, making regular forms, while general triangles have at least 2 triangle types, leading at best to a quasiregular tiling.

There are different notations for expressing these uniform solutions, Wythoff symbol, Coxeter diagram, and Coxeter's t-notation.

Simple tiles are generated by Möbius triangles with whole numbers p,q,r, while Schwarz triangles allow rational numbers p,q,r and allow star polygon faces, and have overlapping elements.

7 generator points 

There are three special cases:
  – Snub forms (alternated) are given by this otherwise unused symbol.
  – A unique snub form for U75 that isn't Wythoff-constructible.

Symmetry triangles 

There are 4 symmetry classes of reflection on the sphere, and three in the Euclidean plane. A few of the infinitely many such patterns in the hyperbolic plane are also listed.  (Increasing any of the numbers defining a hyperbolic or Euclidean tiling makes another hyperbolic tiling.)

Point groups:
 (p 2 2) dihedral symmetry,  (order )
 (3 3 2) tetrahedral symmetry (order 24)
 (4 3 2) octahedral symmetry (order 48)
 (5 3 2) icosahedral symmetry (order 120)
Euclidean (affine) groups:
 (4 4 2) *442 symmetry: 45°-45°-90° triangle
 (6 3 2) *632 symmetry: 30°-60°-90° triangle
 (3 3 3) *333 symmetry: 60°-60°-60° triangle
Hyperbolic groups:
 (7 3 2) *732 symmetry
 (8 3 2) *832 symmetry
 (4 3 3) *433 symmetry
 (4 4 3) *443 symmetry
 (4 4 4) *444 symmetry
 (5 4 2) *542 symmetry
 (6 4 2) *642 symmetry
 ...

The above symmetry groups only include the integer solutions on the sphere. The list of Schwarz triangles includes rational numbers, and determine the full set of solutions of nonconvex uniform polyhedra.

In the tilings above, each triangle is a fundamental domain, colored by even and odd reflections.

Summary spherical, Euclidean and hyperbolic tilings 

Selected tilings created by the Wythoff construction are given below.

Spherical tilings (r = 2)

Some overlapping spherical tilings (r = 2) 

Tilings are shown as polyhedra. Some of the forms are degenerate, given with brackets for vertex figures, with overlapping edges or vertices.

Dihedral symmetry (q = r = 2) 

Spherical tilings with dihedral symmetry exist for all  many with digon faces which become degenerate polyhedra. Two of the eight forms (Rectified and cantillated) are replications and are skipped in the table.

Euclidean and hyperbolic tilings (r = 2) 

Some representative hyperbolic tilings are given, and shown as a Poincaré disk projection.

Euclidean and hyperbolic tilings (r > 2) 

The Coxeter–Dynkin diagram is given in a linear form, although it is actually a triangle, with the trailing segment r connecting to the first node.

See also 
Regular polytope
Regular polyhedron
List of uniform tilings
Uniform tilings in hyperbolic plane
List of uniform polyhedra
List of uniform polyhedra by Schwarz triangle

References 
 Coxeter Regular Polytopes, Third edition, (1973), Dover edition,  (Chapter V: The Kaleidoscope, Section: 5.7 Wythoff's construction)
 Coxeter The Beauty of Geometry: Twelve Essays, Dover Publications, 1999,  (Chapter 3: Wythoff's Construction for Uniform Polytopes)
 Coxeter, Longuet-Higgins, Miller, Uniform polyhedra, Phil. Trans. 1954, 246 A, 401–50.
  pp. 9–10.

External links
 
The Wythoff symbol 
Wythoff symbol 
Greg Egan's applet to display uniform polyhedra using Wythoff's construction method
A Shadertoy renderization of Wythoff's construction method
KaleidoTile 3 Free educational software for Windows by Jeffrey Weeks that generated many of the images on the page.
 

Polyhedra
Polytopes
Mathematical notation